Tifton is a city in Tift County, Georgia, United States. The population was 17,045 at the 2020 census. The city is the county seat of Tift County.

The area's public schools are administered by the Tift County School District. Abraham Baldwin Agricultural College has its main campus in Tifton. Southern Regional Technical College and the University of Georgia also have Tifton campuses.

Sites in the area include the Coastal Plain Research Arboretum, Abraham Baldwin Agricultural College,  and the Georgia Museum of Agriculture & Historic Village. The Tifton Commercial Historic District and the Tifton Residential Historic District are listed on the National Register of Historic Places.

History 

Tifton was founded in 1872 in Berrien County at the junction of the Georgia Southern and Florida Railroad and the Brunswick and Western Railroad by sawmill owner Henry H. Tift.  Tifton was incorporated as a city in 1890.  In 1905, it was designated county seat of the newly formed Tift County.

Several Chicago-Florida and Cincinnati-Florida passenger trains made stops in Tifton: the Atlantic Coast Line's Seminole, Flamingo and City of Miami and the Southern Railway's Ponce de Leon and Royal Palm. With the discontinuance of the City of Miami in 1971, Tifton was left without passenger service.

Geography
Tifton is located in south central Georgia along Interstate 75, which runs north to south through the city, leading north  to Atlanta and south  to Valdosta. Other highways that pass through the city include U.S. Route 41, U.S. Route 82, U.S. Route 319, and Georgia State Route 125.

Demographics

2020 census

As of the 2020 United States census, there were 17,045 people, 5,906 households, and 3,779 families residing in the city.

2010 census
As of the 2010 United States Census, there were 16,350 people living in the city. The racial makeup of the city was 49.4% White, 36.0% Black, 0.1% Native American, 1.9% Asian, 0.0% Pacific Islander, 0.1% from some other race and 1.1% from two or more races. 11.4% were Hispanic or Latino of any race.

2000 census
As of the census of 2000, there were 15,060 people, 5,532 households, and 3,601 families living in the city. The racial makeup of the city was 61.26% White, 31.57% African American, 0.23% Native American, 1.64% Asian, 0.03% Pacific Islander, 4.61% from other races, and 0.65% from two or more races. Hispanic or Latino of any race were 7.56% of the population.

There were 5,532 households, out of which 33.5% had children under the age of 18 living with them, 40.9% were married couples living together, 20.0% had a female householder with no husband present, and 34.9% were non-families. 29.5% of all households were made up of individuals, and 11.2% had someone living alone who was 65 years of age or older. The average household size was 2.50 and the average family size was 3.08.

The median income for a household in the city was $30,234, and the median income for a family was $37,023. Males had a median income of $27,206 versus $20,174 for females. The per capita income for the city was $16,455. About 20.7% of families and 26.9% of the population were below the poverty line, including 41.0% of those under age 18 and 13.7% of those age 65 or over.

Arts and culture

Libraries
Tifton has a public library, in addition to an extensive college library located at nearby Abraham Baldwin Agricultural College.

Points of interest 
 Coastal Plain Research Arboretum
 Georgia Museum of Agriculture & Historic Village

Until recently, Tifton was the home of the world's second largest magnolia tree, which was located in Magnolia Tree Park. In 2004, the tree was burned in a fire. The cause of the fire has never been given by local authorities. Currently, the tree and observation area are blocked from visitors by a gate.  Although it no longer grows, the tree still stands. It is not known where the new second largest magnolia tree resides.

Georgia Museum of Agriculture and Historic Village

The Georgia Museum of Agriculture & Historic Village, formerly known as Agrirama, is located in Tifton, Georgia. It opened on July 4, 1976. The grounds consist of five areas: a traditional farm community of the 1870s, an 1890s progressive farmstead, an industrial sites complex, rural town, and national peanut complex; and the Museum of Agriculture Center. Over 35 structures have been relocated to the  site and faithfully restored or preserved. Costumed interpreters explain and demonstrate the lifestyle and activities of this time in Georgia's history.

Historic districts
The Tifton Residential Historic District was listed on the National Register of Historic Places on April 30, 2008. It is bounded generally by 14th Street, Goff Street, 2nd Street and Forrest Avenue at coordinates .  The Tifton Commercial Historic District and the Tift County Courthouse are also on the National Register.

Sports
In 2000, the boys 10u baseball team won the state championship with an undefeated season (24-0).

In 2010, the indoor football team Georgia Firebirds relocated from Waycross, Georgia to Tifton.

Education

Tift County School District 
The Tift County School District holds pre-school to grade twelve, and consists of, eight elementary schools, two middle schools, one high school, and an alternative school. The district has 467 full-time teachers and over 7,641 students.

Private schools
 Tiftarea Academy, located in Chula, Georgia (K-12)
Grace Baptist Christian School

Higher education
Abraham Baldwin Agricultural College - Main Campus
Southern Regional Technical College - Tifton Campus
University of Georgia - Tifton Agricultural Campus

Media
The Tifton Gazette is a weekly newspaper published Thursdays in Tifton, Georgia. It is operated by South Georgia Media Group, a division of Community Newspaper Holdings Inc. The Tifton Grapevine   is a twice-weekly online newspaper with an email circulation of 5,800. It is operated by Sayles Unlimited Marketing.

Infrastructure

Transportation

Major highways
  Interstate 75 
  U.S. Highway 41 
  U.S. Route 82 
  U.S. Route 319 
  State Route 125

Airports
 Henry Tift Myers Airport is a public airport located two miles (3 km) southeast of Tifton, serving the general aviation community, with no scheduled commercial airline service.

Notable people

 Nanci Bowen - LPGA golfer
 Austin Brown - member of a cappella group Home Free
 Justin Brownlee - professional basketball player for the Barangay Ginebra San Miguel of the PBA
 Caitlin Carmichael - child actress
 Harold Cohen - US Army colonel during World War II and recipient of the Distinguished Service Medal
 Larry Dean - football linebacker for the Minnesota Vikings of the National Football League
 Dennis Dove - former MLB pitcher
 Harold Bascom Durham Jr., US Army 2d Lieutenant awarded the Medal of Honor 
 Todd Fordham - former NFL offensive lineman
 Bob Hoffman - sports promoter
 Kip Moore, country music singer
 Matt Moore - former chairman of the South Carolina Republican Party
 Wyc Orr - politician and lawyer
 Ralph Puckett - US Army Colonel, Distinguished Graduate of the United States Military Academy, awarded Medal of Honor, Distinguished Service Cross (with oak leaf cluster), Silver Star (with oak leaf cluster), Legion of Merit (with 2 oak leaf clusters), etc. 
 Austin Scott - U. S. Congressman representing Georgia's 8th congressional district
 Members of alternative rock band September Hase
 Clay Shiver -former NFL offensive lineman
 James "Chick" Stripling - Fiddler, comedian, and buck dancer 
 Tyson Summers - American college football coach
 Cyndi Thomson - country music singer
 Dina Titus - U.S. Congresswoman representing Nevada's 3rd congressional district
 Neil Norman - Associate Professor College of William & Mary
 Rashod Bateman - football wide receiver for the Baltimore Ravens of the National Football League

Sister city
 Linyi, China (2010)

References

External links

 Tifton, Georgia website
 South Georgia Historic Newspapers Archive, Digital Library of Georgia
 Tifton, Georgia family in 1909

Cities in Georgia (U.S. state)
Micropolitan areas of Georgia (U.S. state)
Cities in Tift County, Georgia
County seats in Georgia (U.S. state)